Stefan Baley (1885–1952) was a Polish psychologist of Ukrainian descent.

1885 births
1952 deaths
Polish psychologists
20th-century psychologists